Tavel may refer to:

Places 

 Tavel, Gard, a commune in France
 Tavel AOC, a French wine appellation from the town of Tavel
 Tafers, a municipality in Switzerland

People 

 Connie Tavel, American television and film executive producer and talent manager
 Ronald Tavel (1936–2009), American writer, director and actor